Banatski Monoštor (Serbian Cyrillic: Банатски Моноштор; Hungarian: Kanizsamonostor) is a village in Serbia. It is situated in the Čoka municipality, in the North Banat District, Vojvodina province. The village has a Hungarian ethnic majority (94.81%) and its population numbering 135 people (2002 census).

See also
List of places in Serbia
List of cities, towns and villages in Vojvodina

Populated places in Serbian Banat
Čoka